Swedish Pastry is a live jazz album by Benny Goodman featuring recordings of Goodman and his then-newly formed septet recorded in 1948 during a two-week set at the Frank Palumbo's Click Club in Philadelphia, Pennsylvania. The septet included a young Swedish clarinetist Stan Hasselgård, tenor-saxophonist Wardell Gray, and pianist Teddy Wilson. The septet was short-lived as Hasselgård died later that year. The LP was released in 1978.

References

1978 live albums
Benny Goodman albums